Simon Horobin (born 22 September 1972) is a British philologist and author.

Life and career
Horobin graduated from the University of Sheffield.
He is a professor of English Language and Literature at the University of Oxford and a Fellow of Magdalen College.

He has been a visiting professor at the University of Connecticut, Harvard University, and Charles University. He has also acted as honorary secretary for the Society for the Study of Medieval Languages and Literature.

Horobin has appeared on several radio and television programmes to discuss linguistic issues and has been interviewed for various articles in numerous national papers. In 2018, he gave a talk on his book The English Language: A Very Short Introduction at Google London.

Selected publications

Books
 The Language of the Chaucer Tradition - D.S. Brewer, 2003
 Chaucer's Language - Palgrave Macmillan, 2006
 Studying the History of Early English - Palgrave Macmillan, 2009
 Does Spelling Matter? - Oxford University Press, 2013
 How English Became English: A Short History of a Global Language - Oxford University Press, 2016
 The English Language: A Very Short Introduction (Very Short Introductions), 2018
 Bagels, Bumf, and Buses: A Day in the Life of the English Language - Oxford University Press, 2019

Articles
 "Spelling It Out: Is It Time English Speakers Loosened Up"? (2014)
 "So Trump Makes Spelling Errors. In the Twitter Age, Whoo Doesn't"? (2017)
 "The True Importance of Good Spelling." (2017)
 "Trump's Covfefe Takes Hold in the Land of the Spelling Bee."

References

External links
 Simon Horobin at Magdalen College

British philologists
1972 births
Living people
Alumni of the University of Glasgow